Stephen Muss (born 1928) is an American real estate developer known for leading the resurgence and redevelopment of Miami Beach, Florida.

Early life and education
Muss was born to a Jewish family in New York City and raised in Bensonhurst, Brooklyn. His father, Alexander, was one of eleven children, six of them brothers who worked for their father's construction company building homes during and after the Great Depression. Muss worked for the family business first as a laborer and then in sales and construction supervision.

Career
Muss eventually went into a partnership with his father founding Alexander Muss & Sons developing 30 acres of tract homes on Long Island. From 1952 through 1968, they went on to develop over 20 subdivisions with about 20,000 houses in Queens, New Jersey, and on Long Island; they also built over 4,000 multifamily units. In the 1950s, his family moved to Florida where his father, now a multi-millionaire, built the Seacoast Towers in Miami Beach, known for the distinctive MiMO architectural style, the Towers of Key Biscayne, and the Towers of Quayside. In 1967, Stephen took over the Florida business, now named the Muss Organization, becoming Miami Beach's single largest landlord.

In 1978, Muss bought the largest hotel in Miami-Dade County, the aging Fontainebleau Hotel (founded by Ben Novack), for $27 million rescuing it from bankruptcy. He injected an additional $100 million into the hotel for improvements and hired the Hilton company to manage it. In 2005, the Muss Organization sold the Fontainebleau to Donald Soffer's Turnberry Associates for $165 million.

Muss was seminal in getting Miami Beach to implement a 3% "bed" tax to rebuild the city's aging infrastructure which included refurbishing and expanding its convention center. He was the president of the Miami Beach Redevelopment Agency. In 1994, he sold the Seacoast Towers for $94 million.

Philanthropy
Muss is the chairman of the Alexander Muss High School in Israel and  honorary chairman of The Lapid, Coalition for High School Age Programs in Israel. Muss has served as Board Chair of Temple Emanu-El and also served on the board of the Miami Art Museum and on the Board of Governors of Haifa University.

Personal life
Muss married the ex-wife of his friend and CenTrust banker David L. Paul, who was sentenced to eleven years in federal prison. His wife Sandra is a daughter of Holocaust survivors and was Board Chair of the Holocaust Memorial in Miami Beach. She is currently a member of the Board of the American Jewish Joint Distribution Committee (JDC). The Musses are members of Temple Emanu-El in Miami Beach.

References

People from Bensonhurst, Brooklyn
20th-century American businesspeople
Jewish American philanthropists
American real estate businesspeople
1928 births
Living people
Philanthropists from New York (state)
21st-century American Jews